When I Was Cruel is Elvis Costello's 19th album, recorded in 2001 and 2002 and released in the US by Island Records on 23 April 2002.

Although formally credited as solo Costello album, this was the first album to feature his new band, The Imposters. Their only difference from his previous band, The Attractions (active 1977-87 and 1994–96), was the replacement of bassist Bruce Thomas, with whom Costello had feuded, with Davey Faragher (formerly of Cracker).

The album was released with multiple track listings worldwide. Costello wrote two songs for the film Prison Song - "Soul for Hire", which was included with all versions of the album, and "Oh Well", which was only included in the track listing in Europe and Japan. Japan also featured as a bonus track a cover of Charlie Chaplin's song "Smile", which was later released as a single.

Track listing
All songs written by Elvis Costello.
 "45" – 3:33
 "Spooky Girlfriend" – 4:22
 "Tear Off Your Own Head (It's a Doll Revolution)" – 3:31
 "When I Was Cruel No. 2" – 7:06 (featuring a sample from Mina's "Un bacio è troppo poco")
 "Soul for Hire" – 3:55
 "15 Petals" – 4:01
 "Tart" – 4:03
 "Dust 2..." – 3:21
 "Dissolve" – 2:22
 "Alibi" – 6:42
 "...Dust" – 3:03
 "Daddy Can I Turn This?" – 3:41
 "My Little Blue Window" – 3:10
"Oh Well" – 2:51 (Europe and Japan only)
 "Episode of Blonde" – 5:0
 "Radio Silence" – 4:58
 "Smile" – 3:05 (Japan only)

Personnel
Elvis Costello – vocals, guitars, horn arrangements on 6, 11, 15, melodica, cymbal, bass, piano, harmonica
Steve Nieve – organ, pianet, piano, vibraphone, melodica, filters
Davey Faragher – bass, handclaps
Pete Thomas – drums, handclaps, percussion, shaker, tambourine

Additional personnel
Steven Kennedy – backing vocals on 1, 12, 13
Leo Pearson – electric tabla on 3, rhythm processor on 5, 8, tambourine, mixing
Bill Ware – vibraphone on 4
Ku-umba Frank Lacy – trumpet on 6, flugelhorn on 11, 15
Curtis Fowlkes – trombone on 6, 11, 15
Jay Rodriguez – tenor saxophone on 6, 11, 15
Roy Nathanson – alto saxophone on 6, 11, 15

Trivia
The song "45" is about being 45 years old, Costello's age when he wrote it. (The song also features Costello's penchant for multiple meanings, referencing the year 1945, .45 caliber pistols, and 45 rpm records.)
The idea and title of "Tear Off Your Own Head (It's A Doll Revolution)" came from a set of Engrish-laden dolls in Japan. It appears in the 2003 film The Shape of Things. The Bangles covered it as the title track on their 2003 album, Doll Revolution.
When the album was released, promotional materials billed it as Costello's "FIRST LOUD ALBUM SINCE 199?".

Charts
Album

Year-end charts

References

External links
 
Review by Connor Ratliff (5/5)

Elvis Costello albums
2002 albums
Albums produced by Elvis Costello
Island Records albums
Mercury Records albums